The following squads and players competed in the World Women's Handball Championship in 2003 in Croatia.

Angola 

 Maria Tavares
 Maria Pedro
 Justina Jose Joaquim Lopez Praca
 Maria Teresa Neto Joaquim 
 Ilda Maria Bengue
 Teresa Ulundo
 Bombo Calandula
 Filomena Jose Trindade 
 Rosa Do Amaral
 Maria Ines Jololo 
 Palmira de Almeida 
 Elisa Webba-Torres
 Marcelina Kiala 
 Luisa Kiala
 Elzira De Fatima Borges Tavares 
 Sami Maluisa Fernandes

Argentina 

 Florencia Busso
 Valentina Kogan
 Mariana Mansilla
 Natalia Nicolich
 Bibiana Barbara Ferrea 
 Maria Magdalena Decilio
 Guadalupe Roman 
 Georgina Visciglia
 Natacha Melillo 
 Nazaret Barile
 Victoria Alvarez
 Florencia Am 
 Karina Seif 
 Maria Pilar Romero

Australia 

 Vera Ignjatovic
 Catherine Kent
 Shelley Roy 
 Olivia Doherty
 Rosalie Boyd
 Marina Kopcalic 
 Tracy Ashby
 Raelene Boulton 
 Jovana Milosevic
 Paola Leone 
 Caitlin Wynne
 Lilly Maher
 Mari Edland 
 Nanna Hedberg
 Belinda Griffiths

Austria 

 Nataliya Rusnatchenko
 Beate Hofmann
 Sylvia Strass
 Birgit Engl
 Rima Sypkus
 Stephanie Ofenböck 
 Sorina Teodorovic
 Ausra Fridrikas
 Edith Mika
 Laura Fritz 
 Barbara Strass 
 Katrin Engel
 Tatjana Logvin 
 Dagmar Müller
 Veronika Kreitmayr

Brazil 

 Chana Franciela Masson
 Darly Zoqbi de Paula
 Fabiana Carvalho Carneiro Diniz 
 Alexandra Priscila Do Nascimento
Ana Amorim Taleska
 Maria Rosa Da Costa Pedro
 Silvia Helena Araujo Pinheiro
 Alessandra Medeiros De Oliveira
 Daniela De Oliveira Piedade 
 Juceli Aparecida Sales Da Rosa 
 Viviane Rodriguez Jacques 
 Aline Silva Dos Santos
 Aline Da Conceicao Da Silva 
 Idalina Borges Mesquita
 Millene Bruna L. Figueiredo
 Ana Paula Rodrigues

China 

 Jie Fan
 Ge Li Yu
 Chao Zhai 
 Yun Liu
 Bing Li 
 Niu
 Yan Xia Cong
 Li Zhang 
 Hong Xia Zhu
 Min Wang 
 Sha Sha Wang 
 Ya Nan Wu 
 Lai Miao Sun 
 Su Fen Lei
 Wei Wei Li

Croatia 

 Sanela Knezovic
 Barbara Stancin
 Klaudija Klikovac
 Dijana Golubic
 Maida Arslanagic
 Renata Hodak 
 Natasa Kolega
 Nikica Pusic
 Antonela Pensa
 Svitlana Pasicnik 
 Maja Mitrovic 
 Marina Kevo
 Tihana Saric
 Marija Culjak 
 Ljerka Vresk

Czech Republic 

 Lenka Cerna
 Vendula Ajglova
 Pavla Skavronkova 
 Iva Zamorska 
 Lucie Fabikova 
 Martina Knytlova 
 Simona Roubinkova 
 Alena Polaskova 
 Jana Fischerova 
 Marta Adamkova 
 Petra Valova 
 Petra Cumplova 
 Katerina Vaskova 
 Jana Arnosova
 Pavla Plaminkova
 Jana Simerska

Denmark 

 Lene Rantala
 Rikke Poulsen Schmidt
 Karin Mortensen
 Heidi Johansen
 Rikke Erhardsen Skov 
 Tine Ladefoged
 Rikke Nielsen
 Christina Roslyng Hansen 
 Rikke Hörlykke Jörgensen
 Camilla Thomsen 
 Lise Knudsen
 Anne Petersen 
 Katrine Fruelund 
 Karen Brödsgaard
 Line Daugaard 
 Maria Josephine Touray

France 

 Stéphanie Cano
 Joanne Dudziak
 Myriame Said Mohamed
 Isabelle Cendier Ajaguin
 Sophie Herbrecht
 Estelle Vogein
 Leila Lejeune
 Isabelle Wendling
 Sandrine Delerce
 Myriam Borg-Korfanty
 Mélinda Jacques-Szabo
 Stéphanie Ludwig
 Nodjialem Myaro
 Valérie Nicolas
 Véronique Pecqueux-Rolland
 Raphaëlle Tervel

Germany 

 Sabine Englert
 Sylvia Harlander
 Clara Woltering
 Ingrida Radzeviciute 
 Nadine Krause
 Grit Jurack 
 Milica Danilovic 
 Nina Christin Wörz 
 Susanne Henze
 Nikola Pietzsch 
 Melanie Schliecker
 Kathrin Blacha 
 Anja Althaus 
 Heike Ahlgrimm
 Heike Schmidt 
 Stefanie Melbeck

Hungary 

 Irina Sirina
 Bernadett Ferling
 Beáta Bohus
 Ibolya Mehlmann
 Erika Kirsner
 Hortenzia Szrnka
 Bojana Radulovics
 Krisztina Pigniczki
 Ágnes Farkas
 Tímea Sugár
 Anita Görbicz
 Eszter Siti
 Katalin Pálinger
 Tímea Tóth
 Zsuzsanna Lovász
 Anita Kulcsár

Ivory Coast 

 Josee Lobouo
 Edwige Marie J. Zadi
 Justine Koffi
 Catherine Seri Tape 
 Gertrude Bliva
 Elodie N’Cho Mambo 
 Celine Affoua Dongo
 Marie-Ange Gogbe 
 Julie Toualy 
 Paula Arlette Gondo 
 Alimata Dosso 
 Rosine Koabena 
 Fatoumata Diomande
 Adeline Koudou

Japan 

 Mami Tanaka
 Kimiko Hida
 Minako Morimoto 
 Kaori Onozawa
 Mineko Tanaka 
 Masayo Oishi 
 Yuko Arihama
 Kiha Inyoshi 
 Hitomi Sakugawa 
 Aiko Hayafune 
 Akiko Kinjo 
 Yumi Tomita
 Akane Aoto 
 Shiori Kamimachi

Norway 

 Cecilie Leganger
 Heidi Tjugum
 Katrine Lunde
 Ragnhild Aamodt
 Tonje Larsen 
 Katja Nyberg 
 Unni Nyhamar Hinkel 
 Else-Marthe Sörlie-Lybekk 
 Monica Sandve 
 Kristine Lunde-Borgersen 
 Gro Hammerseng 
 Berit Hynne 
 Elisabeth Hilmo
 Anette Hovind Johansen 
 Linn-Kristin Riegelhuth
 Vigdis Haarsaker

Romania 

 Ildiko Kerekes Barbu
 Luminita Hutupan Dinu
 Tereza Tamas
 Gabriela Doina Hobjila
 Ionela Gilca
 Carmen Lungu
 Mihaela Ani Senocico 
 Aurelia Bradeanu 
 Alina Nicoleta Dobrin 
 Cristina Georgiana Varzaru
 Steluta Luca
 Valentina Ardean Elisei
 Simona Silvia Gogirla 
 Aurica Valeria Bese 
 Nicoleta Cristina Gisca 
 Georgeta Vartic

Russia 

 Tatiana Alizar
 Inna Suslina
 Natalia Shipilova 
 Liudmila Pazich 
 Oksana Romenskaya
 Liudmila Postnova
 Anna Kareeva 
 Liudmila Bodnieva 
 Nadezda Muravyeva 
 Tatiana Diadetchko 
 Alina Dolgikh 
 Irina Poltoratskaya 
 Svetlana Smirnova
 Elena Chaplina
 Anna Kurepta
 Marina Naukovich

Serbia and Montenegro 

 Sladana Djeric
 Ana Vojcic
 Marija Popovic 
 Ana Djokic 
 Ivana Mladenovic 
 Ljiljana Knezevic 
 Tanja Tomanovic
 Ana Batinic 
 Maja Savic 
 Bojana Petrovic 
 Tanja Milanovic 
 Svetlana Ognjenovic 
 Marina Rokic 
 Adrijana Budimir
 Jelena Savkovic

Slovenia 

 Misa Marincek
 Nada Tutnjic
 Barbara Gorski
 Olga Ceckova 
 Mojca Dercar 
 Elena Krese
 Deja Doler 
 Silvana Ilic 
 Vesna Vincic-Pus
 Nataliya Derepasko 
 Katja Kurent
 Spela Cerar
 Tanja Dajcman 
 Tatjana Oder
 Beata Agnieszka Matuszewska 
 Anja Freser

South Korea 

 Oh Yong-ran
 Woo Sun-hee
 Huh Soon-young
 Lee Gong-joo
 Jang So-hee
 Kim Cha-youn
 Oh Seong-ok
 Huh Young-sook
 Moon Kyeong-ha
 Lim O-kyeong
 Park Jung-hee
 Lee Sang-eun
 Lee Min-hee
 Myoung Bok-hee
 Choi Im-jeong
 Moon Pil-hee

Spain 

 Elisabet Lopez Valledor
 Maria Sanchez Bravo
 Aitziber Elejaga Vargas
 Lidia Sanchez Alias
 Susana Pareja Ibarra
 Vanessa Amoros Quiles
 Cristina Esmeralda Lopez Quiros 
 Cristina Gomez Arquer 
 Marta Elisabet Mangue Gonzales 
 Soraya Garcia Leite
 Montserrat Puche Diaz 
 Susana Fraile Celaya 
 Gemma Lujan Suarez
 Veronica Maria Cuadrado Dehesa
 Noelia Oncina Morena 
 Patricia Pinedo Saenz

Tunisia 

 Noura Ben Slama
 Mouna Chebbah 
 Rym Mannai
 Hela Msaad 
 Raja Toumi 
 Ouided Kilani 
 Haifa Abdelhak 
 Rafika Ettaqui

Ukraine 

 Natalya Borysenko
 Irina Hontcharova
 Larysa Zaspa
 Iryna Chernova
 Oksana Sakada 
 Kateryna Rybina
 Maryna Vergelyuk 
 Olena Iatsenko 
 Ganna Syukalo 
 Olena Tsyhytsia 
 Nataliya Lyapina 
 Anastasiya Borodina
 Oksana Raykhel 
 Yana Hyrholiunas 
 Iryna Shutska Sheyenko
 Olena Radchenko

Uruguay 

 Victoria Laicouschi Klosz
 Polcaro Infanzon
 Grana Vinoli
 Claudia Porteiro Rodriguez 
 Ivanna Scavino Martinez
 Marcela Schelotto Musetti
 Mercedes Amor Estrago
 Terragno Barrios
 Veronica Castro Yanez 
 Jussara Castro Yanez 
 Maria Lorena Estefanell
 Sofia Griot Gayoso
 Mariana Fleitas Riera
 Maria Noel Uriarte Radmilovic

References 

World Women's Handball Championship squads
World Handball Championship squads